Rendezvous with Death is a 2006 German documentary film that claims that G2, a secret service organization of the Cuban government, organized the assassination of U.S. President John F. Kennedy. The film first aired on January 6, 2006 on German television station Das Erste. It was directed by Wilfried Huismann.

Synopsis 
Rendezvous with Death features interviews with four Cuban former secret service agents and an American FBI agent, and also cites documents from KGB and Mexican government archives.

A possible Cuban connection was investigated by the US immediately after Kennedy's death. But an FBI officer sent to follow the Oswald's trail during a visit to Mexico was recalled after only three days and the investigation called off. Laurence Keenan, now 81, said it was "perhaps the worst investigation the FBI was ever involved in". "I realised that I was used. I felt ashamed. We missed a moment in history," Mr Keenan said.

Veteran US official Alexander Haig told the filmmaker that Kennedy's successor, Lyndon B. Johnson, believed Cuba was to blame and feared a pronounced swing to the right if the truth were known that would keep the Democrats out of power for a long time. Mr Haig - a US military adviser at the time and later a secretary of state - told the filmmakers Johnson said: "We must simply not allow the American people to believe Fidel Castro could have killed our president. [...] He [Johnson] was convinced Castro killed Kennedy and he took it to his grave."

External links
 
 $6,500 to kill a president: did Oswald sell his soul to Cuba? in The Times
 Film: Cuban secret service organized JFK's murder in The Miami Herald

Documentary films about the assassination of John F. Kennedy
German documentary films
2000s German-language films
2006 television films
2006 films
2006 documentary films
Westdeutscher Rundfunk
2000s American films
2000s German films